Fluoroacetate may refer to:

 Fluoroacetic acid
 Sodium fluoroacetate